Nymphuliella is a monotypic moth genus of the family Crambidae described by William Harry Lange in 1956. It contains only one species, Nymphuliella daeckealis, known in the US as the china mark moth, described by F. Haimbach in 1915. It is found in the United States from New Jersey south to Florida and west to Colorado.

The wingspan is 10–12 mm. The wings are blackish fuscous, with a white line on the forewings, running from the costa to beyond the middle. There is a pale transverse postmedian line on the hindwings. Adults are on wing from May to October.

The larvae feed on the leaves of water lilies and water hyacinth. The species overwinters in the larval stage, with the larvae attached to underwater stems of the host plant.

References

Natural History Museum Lepidoptera genus database

Acentropinae
Crambidae genera